Frank E. X. Dance (born November 9, 1929, Brooklyn) is an American communication professor. In 1994–1995, he was John Evans Professor at University of Denver.

Life
He graduated from Fordham University and Northwestern University.

Legacy
A scholarship is named for him at University of Wisconsin.

Works

References

External links
Review of Communication, 6 (3), 221–227.
https://web.archive.org/web/20131029192813/http://www.debraaustin.info/dance/methodology.htm

1929 births
Living people
People from Brooklyn
University of Denver faculty
Fordham University alumni
Northwestern University alumni
Communication scholars